The 2020 Idaho House of Representatives elections took place as part of the biennial United States elections on November 3, 2020. Idaho voters elected state representatives in all 70 seats of the House, electing 2 state representatives in each of the 35 Idaho state legislative districts. State representatives serve two-year terms in the Idaho House of Representatives.

Following the previous election, Republicans held a 56-to-14 seat majority over Democrats.

Republicans retained control of the Idaho House of Representatives following the 2020 general election and gained two seats with the balance of power shifting to 58 (R) to 12 (D).

Predictions

Summary of Results

Closest races 
Seats where the margin of victory was under 10%:
District 15
  
  gain 
District 26
   
District 29
  gain

Summary of Results by House District

Source:

Detailed Results by House District

Note: Official primary results can be obtained here and official general election results here.

District 1
Seat A

Seat B

District 2
Seat A

Seat B

District 3
Seat A

Seat B

District 4
Seat A

Seat B

District 5
Seat A

Seat B

District 6
Seat A

Seat B

District 7
Seat A

Seat B

District 8
Seat A

Seat B

District 9
Seat A

Seat B

District 10
Seat A

Seat B

District 11
Seat A

Seat B

District 12
Seat A

Seat B

District 13
Seat A

Seat B

District 14
Seat A

Seat B

District 15
Seat A

Seat B

District 16
Seat A

Seat B

District 17
Seat A

Seat B

District 18
Seat A

Seat B

District 19
Seat A

Seat B

District 20
Seat A

Seat B

District 21
Seat A

Seat B

District 22
Seat A

Seat B

District 23
Seat A

Seat B

District 24
Seat A

Seat B

District 25
Seat A

Seat B

District 26
Seat A

Seat B

District 27
Seat A

Seat B

District 28
Seat A

Seat B

District 29
Seat A

Seat B

District 30
Seat A

Seat B

District 31
Seat A

Seat B

District 32
Seat A

Seat B

District 33
Seat A

Seat B

District 34
Seat A

Seat B

District 35
Seat A

Seat B

See also
2020 Idaho elections
2020 Idaho Senate election
2020 United States Senate election in Idaho
2020 United States presidential election in Idaho
2020 United States House of Representatives elections in Idaho

References

Idaho House of Representatives elections
2020 Idaho elections
Idaho House of Representatives